Dong Phou Vieng National Protected Area is a national protected area in Savannakhet Province in central Laos. This mostly forested park is home to large variety of animal species and contains part of the former Ho Chi Minh trail. The park is home to the Katang ethnic group and is an ecotourism destination.

Geography

History
In 1995 Dong Phou Vieng National Protected Area initially covered .

Flora and fauna
The park's main forest types are semi-evergreen, deciduous dipterocarp and mixed deciduous belonging to the Central Indochina dry forests region. Semi-evergreen forest covers half of the park's area.

Animal species include leaf monkey, gibbon, douc langur, gaur, giant muntjac, dhole, jackal, tiger, pangolin, python and king cobra. Two herds of wild elephants are known in the park.

Bird life includes the oriental pied hornbill, great hornbill, wreathed hornbill,
white-rumped vulture and red-headed vulture.

Threats
Dong Phou Vieng faces a number of environmental threats. The most significant is hunting and poaching of animals including endangered species such as pangolin and king cobra. Other threats include destructive fishing practices and expansion of rice paddy fields.

References

National Biodiversity Conservation Areas
Protected areas established in 1995
Geography of Savannakhet province